is a Japanese actress and voice actress who is affiliated with Mausu Promotion. She is married to Makoto Yasue, a sound director employed by Glovision. On Twitter under the name chiffons, she reported the birth of her first son on August 3, 2011 in a tweet on August 11, 2011, and the birth of her second son on May 15, 2013 in a tweet on May 17, 2013.

Biography

Filmography

Mixed media
Galaxy Angel series (????) (Creta)
Sakura Wars series (????) (Mell Raison)

Television animation
1999
Cowboy Bebop (Angel)
2001
Baki the Grappler (Kozue Matsumoto)
2002
Saikano (Yukari)
Tokyo Underground (Hekisa)
2003
Nanaka 6/17 (Airne Aratama)
2004
Tweeny Witches (Arusu)
Sonic X (Molly)
The Galaxy Railways (Tina)
2006
Ergo Proxy (Monad Proxy)
Inukami! (Snake Woman)
Kage Kara Mamoru! (Tsubaki Mapputatsu)
Lemon Angel Project (Keiko Shikina)
Ray the Animation (Burūsokkusu)
2007
Bamboo Blade (Sayako Kuwahara)
Dennō Coil (Fumie)
Kekkaishi (Aihi)
Emily of New Moon (Ilse Burnley)
2008
Rosario + Vampire (Kyōko Aono)
2009
Aoi Hana (Hanae)
Stitch! The Mischievous Alien's Great Adventure (Sand)
Viper's Creed (Maika)
2012
AKB0048 (Mikako Minamino)
High School DxD (Issei's mother)
Psycho-Pass (Chika Shimazu)
2013
JoJo's Bizarre Adventure: Battle Tendency (Suzi Q)
2014
Marvel Disk Wars: The Avengers (Rosetta Riley)
HappinessCharge PreCure! (Miyo Masuko)
JoJo's Bizarre Adventure: Stardust Crusaders (Suzi Q)
2015
Maria the Virgin Witch (Lolotte)
2016
Active Raid (Governor's Secretary)
Cardfight!! Vanguard G Stride Gate (Hiroki Moriyama)
2019
Fruits Basket (Okami Soma)
Star Twinkle PreCure (Terumi Hoshina)
2020
Boruto: Naruto Next Generations (Sakuya)

Unknown date
Monkey Typhoon (Karin Kuramu)
Naruto (Female Orochimaru)

Theatrical animation
Naruto the Movie 2: Great Clash! The Illusionary Ruins at the Depths of the Earth (2005) (Kamira)

Original video animation
Mobile Suit Gundam: The Witch from Mercury Prologue (2022) (Nyla Bertran)

Video games
Panzer Dragoon Saga (Fei)
Wild Arms 4 (Belial)
Drakengard 2 (Hanch)
Everybody's Tennis (Jun)
Soulcalibur Legends (Taki)
Soulcalibur IV (Taki)
Soulcalibur: Broken Destiny (Taki)
Way of the Samurai 4 (Akemi, Madara)
Everybody's Golf 6 (Satsuki)
Granblue Fantasy (Scathacha)
Valkyria Chronicles IV (Hanna Ivanovic)
Apex Legends (Wraith - Japanese voice)
Fire Emblem: Three Houses (Manuela)

Unknown date
Ys I & II (????) (Maria)

Dubbing

Live-action
Amanda Seyfried
Mamma Mia! (Sophie Sheridan)
Jennifer's Body (Anita "Needy" Lesnicki)
Letters to Juliet (Sophie Hall)
Lovelace (Linda Lovelace)
A Million Ways to Die in the West (Louise)
Love the Coopers (Ruby)
The Last Word (Anne Sherman)
Mamma Mia! Here We Go Again (Sophie Sheridan)
The Art of Racing in the Rain (Avery "Eve" Swift)
Mank (Marion Davies)
Things Heard & Seen (Catherine Claire)
Anna Paquin
A Walk on the Moon (Allison Kantrowitz)
Almost Famous (Polexia Aphrodisia)
Finding Forrester (Claire)
X-Men (Rogue)
25th Hour (Mary D'Annunzio)
X2 (Rogue)
10 Things I Hate About You (Kat Stratford (Julia Stiles))
17 Again (Maggie (Michelle Trachtenberg))
American Beauty (Angela (Mena Suvari))
The Animal (Rianna (Colleen Haskell))
Batman Begins (Rachel Dawes (Katie Holmes))
Beethoven (Ryce Newton (Nicholle Tom))
Big Little Lies (Madeline Martha Mackenzie (Reese Witherspoon))
Blade Runner: The Final Cut (Pris (Daryl Hannah))
Bram Stoker's Dracula (15th Anniversary edition) (Lucy Westenra (Sadie Frost))
The Breakfast Club (Claire Standish (Molly Ringwald))
Casper (Kathleen Harvey (Christina Ricci))
Cats & Dogs: The Revenge of Kitty Galore (Catherine (Christina Applegate))
Child's Play (Karen Barclay (Aubrey Plaza))
Clerks (Veronica Loughran (Marilyn Ghigliotti))
A Dog's Purpose (Maya (Kirby Howell-Baptiste))
Dr. Dolittle 3 (Maya Dolittle (Kyla Pratt))
Dr. Dolittle: Tail to the Chief (Maya Dolittle (Kyla Pratt))
Dr. Dolittle: Million Dollar Mutts (Maya Dolittle (Kyla Pratt))
Drag Me to Hell (Christine Brown (Alison Lohman))
Election (Tammy Metzler (Jessica Campbell))
Eragon (Angela (Joss Stone))
Everwood (Amy Abbott (Emily VanCamp))
Fat Albert (Doris Robertson (Kyla Pratt))
Fireproof (Catherine Holt (Erin Bethea))
Genius (Marie-Thérèse Walter (Poppy Delevingne))
Girl, Interrupted (Daisy Randone (Brittany Murphy))
The Girl Next Door (Meg Loughlin (Blythe Auffarth))
A Good Year (Fanny Chenal (Marion Cotillard))
Goosebumps (Attack of the Jack O' Lanterns) (Drew (Erica Luttrell))
(The Blob That Ate Everyone) (Alex) 
(Chillogy Pt. 1 Squeal of Fortune) (Nicky)
Grey's Anatomy (Hannah Davies (Christina Ricci))
Hit and Run (Mary Murdock (Laura Breckenridge))
Hotel for Dogs (Andi (Emma Roberts))
The House Bunny (Shelley Darlingson (Anna Faris))
Hustlers (Destiny (Constance Wu))
I Am Mother (Mother (Rose Byrne))
I Origins (Priya Varma (Archie Panjabi))
Infinitely Polar Bear (Amelia Stuart (Imogene Wolodarsky))
Joe Dirt 2: Beautiful Loser (Brandy (Brittany Daniel))
A Knight's Tale (Jocelyn (Shannyn Sossamon))
Life After Beth (Beth Slocum (Aubrey Plaza))
Life with Derek (Casey McDonald (Ashley Leggat))
Lost in Translation (Kelly (Anna Faris))
Mars Attacks! (Taffy Dale (Natalie Portman))
The Messengers (Jessica Solomon (Kristen Stewart))
Mighty Joe Young (Jill Young (Charlize Theron))
Never Been Kissed (Aldys (Leelee Sobieski))
No Strings Attached (Dr. Patrice (Greta Gerwig))
Not One Less (Teacher Wei (Wei Minzhi))
One Chance (Julie-Ann "Julz" Potts (Alexandra Roach))
The Originals (Rebekah Mikaelson (Claire Holt))
Pieces of April (April Burns (Katie Holmes))
Power Rangers: Samurai (Mia Watanbe/Pink Samurai Ranger (Erika Fong))
The Sapphires (Cynthia (Miranda Tapsell))
SEAL Team (Alana Hayes (Michaela McManus))
The Sisterhood of the Traveling Pants (Tibby Rollins (Amber Tamblyn))
The Sisterhood of the Traveling Pants 2 (Tibby Rollins (Amber Tamblyn))
Sisters (Maura Ellis (Amy Poehler))
Sleepy Hollow (Katrina Van Tassel (Christina Ricci))
Slither (Kylie Strutemyer (Tania Saulnier))
Step Up Revolution (DJ Penelope (Cleopatra Coleman))
Take the Lead (LaRhette Dudley (Yaya DaCosta))
Ted (Tami-Lynn (Jessica Barth))
Ted 2 (Tami-Lynn (Jessica Barth))
The To Do List (Brandy Klark (Aubrey Plaza))
The Twilight Zone (Eve Martin (Ginnifer Goodwin))
Unbreakable Kimmy Schmidt (Kimmy Schmidt (Ellie Kemper))
The Vow (Paige Collins (Rachel McAdams))
The Yellow Handkerchief (Martine (Kristen Stewart))

Animation
Chicken Little (Abby Mallard)
Chuggington (Emery)
Curious George (Cayley)
Hi Hi Puffy AmiYumi (Yumi)
¡Mucha Lucha! (Buena Girl)
Sabrina: The Animated Series (Sabrina Spellman)
Spider-Man: Into the Spider-Verse (Rio Morales)
Star Trek: Lower Decks (Beckett Mariner)
Steven Universe (Pearl)
Wander Over Yonder (Lord Dominator)

References

External links
Official agency profile 
Sachiko Kojima at GamePlaza-Haruka Voice Acting Database 
Sachiko Kojima at Hitoshi Doi's Seiyuu Database

1979 births
Living people
Japanese child actresses
Japanese video game actresses
Japanese voice actresses
Mausu Promotion voice actors
Voice actresses from Chiba Prefecture
20th-century Japanese actresses
21st-century Japanese actresses